The 1940 Arkansas State Indians football team represented Arkansas State College—now known as Arkansas State University—as a member of the Arkansas Intercollegiate Conference (AIC) during the 1940 college football season. Led by second-year head coach Bill Adams, the Indians compiled an overall record of 1–4–2.

Schedule

References

Arkansas State
Arkansas State Red Wolves football seasons
Arkansas State Indians football